The individual dressage at the 2009 FEI European Jumping and Dressage Championships in Windsor, Great Britain was held at Windsor Castle from 25 to 30 August.

The Netherlands's Edward Gal won the gold medal in the Grand Prix Freestyle. Adelinde Cornelissen representing Netherlands won a golden medal the Grand Prix Special and silver in the Grand Prix Freestyle. Laura Bechtolsheimer of Great Britain won a bronze in the Special while Dutch triple Olympic gold medalist Anky van Grunsven won the bronze medal in the Freestyle. In the Grand Prix The Netherlands won the golden team medal, while the Great Britain won the silver medal and Germany bronze.Edward Gal broke the World Record in the Grand Prix Freestyle with scoring for the first time over the 90%. He also broke the World Record in the Grand Prix Special, but Adelinde Cornelissen, who rode her test after Edward broke the WR again.

Competition format

The team and individual dressage competitions used the same results. Dressage had three phases. The first phase was the Grand Prix. Top 30 individuals advanced to the second phase, the Grand Prix Special where the first individual medals were awarded. The last set of medals at the 2013 European Dressage Championships was awarded after the third phase, the Grand Prix Freestyle where top 15 combinations competed, with a maximum of the three best riders per country.

Judges
The following judges were appointed to officiate during the European Dressage Championships.

  Stephen Clarke (Ground Jury President)
  Isabelle Judet (Ground Jury Member)
  Francis Verbeek- van Rooy (Ground Jury Member)
  Anne Gribbons (Ground Jury Member)
  Wojtech Markowski (Ground Jury Member)
  Katrina Wüst (Ground Jury Member)
  Eric Lette (Ground Jury Member)

Schedule

All times are Central European Summer Time (UTC-0)

Results

References

2009 in equestrian